Prolargin is a protein that in humans is encoded by the PRELP gene.

The protein encoded by this gene is a leucine-rich repeat protein present in connective tissue  extracellular matrix. This protein functions as a molecule anchoring basement membranes to the underlying connective tissue. This protein has been shown to bind type I collagen to basement membranes and type II collagen to cartilage. It also binds the basement membrane heparan sulfate proteoglycan perlecan. This protein is suggested to be involved in the pathogenesis of Hutchinson–Gilford progeria (HGP), which is reported to lack the binding of collagen in basement membranes and cartilage. Alternatively spliced transcript variants encoding the same protein have been observed.

References

Further reading

Progeroid syndromes
Collagens